The 2022 FIFA World Cup opening ceremony took place on Sunday, 20 November 2022 at the Al Bayt Stadium in Al Khor, prior to the opening match of the tournament between hosts Qatar and Ecuador. It included appearances by Morgan Freeman and Ghanim Al-Muftah, and a performance by South Korean singer Jungkook of BTS.

Ceremony 
Italian creative director Marco Balich, who previously worked on several Olympic opening and closing ceremonies, collaborated with co-artistic director Akhmed Al Baker during production.

The ceremony included many symbolic indications that express welcome, generosity and hospitality in Arab culture, as well as contemporary musical, cultural and visual performances that were used for the first time in the tournament, under a “Tent” decoration that represents the Earth, in a message to invite the world to meet and unite. The ceremony, which lasted for about 30 minutes, was dominated by Arab states of the Persian Gulf and Arab heritage.

Panels 
The ceremony included seven panels that merged the Qatari and international cultures, showing the country's culture and values, the importance of respecting the other, and the need to change the misconception about the Arab world.

The first panel, "The Calling", depicted the sound of "El-Hoon", which is associated with receiving guests. During the "To Get to Know" panel, Qatari personality Ghanim Al-Muftah engaged in a conversation with American artist Morgan Freeman, during which Al-Muftah recited verse 13 of Surat Al-Hujurat:
calling for acceptance of difference and diversity among human beings, within a framework of peace and love.

The "Rhythm of Nations" panel combined Qatari music with the most famous cheers of encouragement for the 32 participating teams. This was followed by the "Football Nostalgia" panel, which collects former official mascots in honour of the previous host countries of the World Cup, followed by the "Dreamers" panel, which included performances by member of the Korean band BTS, Jungkook, who was later joined by Qatari artist Fahad Al Kubaisi.

An archival historical film was shown for the first time during the "Roots of the Dream" panel, showing the former Emir, Sheikh Hamad bin Khalifa Al Thani, playing football with a group of his friends. The ceremony concluded with the panel "Here and Now", which consisted of a speech by the Emir of the State of Qatar, Sheikh Tamim bin Hamad Al Thani, and ended with the appearance of the official logo of the 2022 FIFA World Cup at a height of 15 meters coupled with a fireworks display.

Dignitaries in attendance 
A number of foreign politicians and dignitaries attended the opening ceremony, including 17 heads of state, government and international organizations.

 President of FIFA – Gianni Infantino and all members of the FIFA Council
 President of the International Olympic Committee – Thomas Bach
 Secretary-General of the United Nations – António Guterres
 Director-General of WHO – Tedros Adhanom Ghebreyesus
 President of Algeria – Abdelmadjid Tebboune
 Crown Prince of Bahrain – Salman bin Hamad Al Khalifa
 President of Djibouti – Ismail Omar Guelleh
 Vice President of Ecuador – Alfredo Borrero
 President of Egypt – Abdel Fattah el-Sisi
 Vice President of the European Commission – Margaritis Schinas
 Vice President of India – Jagdeep Dhankhar
 Minister of Sports of Iran – Hamid Sajjadi
 King of Jordan – Abdullah II and Hussein, Crown Prince of Jordan
 Former President of Kosovo – Atifete Jahjaga
 Crown Prince of Kuwait – Mishal Al-Ahmad Al-Jaber Al-Sabah
 Prime Minister of Lebanon – Najib Mikati
 President of Liberia – George Weah
 Prime Minister of Libya – Fathi Bashagha
 Crown Prince and Sports Minister of Oman – Theyazin bin Haitham
 President of Palestine – Mahmoud Abbas
 Emir of Qatar – Tamim bin Hamad Al Thani, Former Emir of Qatar – Hamad bin Khalifa Al Thani and members of the Qatari Royal Family
 Assistant to the President of Russia – Igor Levitin
 President of Rwanda – Paul Kagame
 Crown Prince of Saudi Arabia – Mohammed bin Salman
 President of Senegal – Macky Sall
 King and Queen of the Zulu tribe of South Africa – Misuzulu kaZwelithini and Ntokozo Mayisela-Zulu
 President of Turkey – Recep Tayyip Erdoğan
 Prime Minister of the United Arab Emirates – Mohammed bin Rashid Al Maktoum
 Former United States Deputy Secretary of State – Keith Krach
 Vice President of Venezuela – Delcy Rodriguez
 First Minister of Wales – Mark Drakeford

References 

2022 FIFA World Cup
FIFA World Cup opening ceremonies
Ceremonies in Qatar
November 2022 sports events in Qatar